Kölliken Oberdorf railway station is a railway station in the municipality of Kölliken, in the Swiss canton of Aargau. It is an intermediate stop on the standard gauge Zofingen–Wettingen line of Swiss Federal Railways.

Services
The following services stop at Kölliken Oberdorf:

References

External links 
 
 

Railway stations in the canton of Aargau
Swiss Federal Railways stations